Saint Parthenius (died 3rd century) was an early Christian saint and martyr from Rome of Armenian origin. He is venerated in both the Catholic and Orthodox churches.  His brother was Saint Calocerus.  He is the patron of Galicia and included in their list of Orthodox saints.

Death
While serving as a eunuch in his wife's palace, Parthenius was accused by Roman emperor  Decius with embezzlement of Anatolia's money, and with the capital crime of Christianity. Ignoring the financial accusations, Parthenius and his brother defended the Christian faith. The court took their defense as an admission of their Christianity and sentenced them to death.  Parthenius was thrown into a bonfire but did not burn.  In order to carry out his sentence, guards took flaming brands from the fire and beat him to death. He was buried in the catacombs under Saint Callixtus.

Relics
In the 18th century, relics of St. Parthenius were moved to Vienna. In 1784, with the permission of Pope Pius VI, the relics were moved to Zhovkva in Eastern Galicia (then Austrian Empire, nowadays western Ukraine). They are now preserved in the Basilian Ukrainian Greek-Catholic monastery of Holy Jesus Heart in Zhovkva.

Memorial day

 19 May

References
 Православні святині Галичини (in Ukrainian)
 Butler´s Lives of Saints: St. Parthenius

4th-century Christian martyrs
4th-century deaths
Armenian saints
Year of birth unknown
Ukrainian people of Armenian descent
History of Galicia (Eastern Europe)